Abdullah Shuhail (born 22 January 1985) is a Saudi football player .

Shuhail has made several appearances for the Saudi Arabia national football team, including six qualifying matches for 2010 FIFA World Cup.

References

External links

1985 births
Living people
Saudi Arabian footballers
Saudi Arabia international footballers
Al-Shabab FC (Riyadh) players
2011 AFC Asian Cup players
Ittihad FC players
Saudi Professional League players
Association football fullbacks